Hilton New Orleans/St. Charles Avenue, located at 333 St. Charles Avenue in the Central Business District of New Orleans, Louisiana, USA, is a 20-story, -tall skyscraper and part of the Hilton Hotels chain. The building was originally the Masonic Temple, but was sold in 1992 and redeveloped as Hotel Monaco until Hurricane Katrina in 2005. It did not reopen after Katrina. The hotel reopened in 2007 as a Hilton. Hilton New Orleans/St. Charles Avenue was also inducted into Historic Hotels of America, the official program of the National Trust for Historic Preservation, in 2015.

See also
 List of tallest buildings in New Orleans

References

External links
 Hilton New Orleans/St. Charles Avenue Official Website

Skyscraper hotels in New Orleans
Masonic buildings in Louisiana
New Orleans Saint Charles Avenue
Historic Hotels of America